Hell to Eternity is a 1960 American World War II film starring Jeffrey Hunter, David Janssen, Vic Damone and Patricia Owens, directed by Phil Karlson. This film biopic is about the true experiences of Marine hero Pfc. Guy Gabaldon (played by Hunter), a Los Angeles Hispanic boy raised in the 1930s by a Japanese American foster family, and his heroic actions during the Battle of Saipan. Sessue Hayakawa played the role of Japanese commander at Saipan.

Plot
In Depression-era Los Angeles, Guy Gabaldon gets into a fight at school when another boy snitches about his breaking into a grocery store. After Japanese-American Kaz Une (the brother of Guy's physical education teacher and friend George) learns that Guy's mother is in the hospital and his father is dead, he invites Guy to stay with his family. As Kaz's parents speak little English, Guy begins to learn Japanese. Then, when Guy's mother dies, the Unis adopt him. He becomes especially close to Kaz's mother.

After the attack on Pearl Harbor and the US entry into World War II, Gabaldon's foster family is sent to an internment camp: Camp Manzanar. Gabaldon is drafted, but fails his physical exam due to a perforated eardrum. When Gabaldon goes to visit the Unis, he learns that George and Kaz have been allowed to join the Army and are fighting in Italy with the 442nd Regimental Combat Team. After making sure that "mama-san" does not object, he manages to enlist in the Marines on the strength of his language skills.

Gabaldon does not make a good first impression on Platoon Sgt. Bill Hazen at Camp Pendleton, but wins him over. When they are shipped to Hawaii to join the Regimental Intelligence section of the 2nd Marines, 2nd Marine Division, he gets himself, Hazen and Cpl. Pete Lewis bottles of whiskey and dates with two Japanese-American women and standoffish reporter Sheila Lincoln. Sheila is disgusted by the behavior of the rowdy Marines, but eventually warms up to Gabaldon after a few drinks.

Going ashore on Saipan, he freezes at first when he comes under fire for the first time, but regains his composure. He uses his Japanese language skills to persuade Japanese soldiers to surrender. In fighting against a banzai charge, Lewis is killed, and later during the bloody campaign for the island, Sgt. Hazen is shot in the leg, becomes pinned down and subsequently killed by a Japanese swordsman. Gabaldon then becomes enraged, stops talking Japanese soldiers into surrendering and starts killing them ruthlessly. After he witnesses two civilians commit suicide rather than surrender, he remembers George and "mama-san" and reverts back to the way he was before. During the final battle, he convinces the Japanese general to order approximately 1000 Japanese soldiers, and 500 civilians to surrender.

Cast
 Jeffrey Hunter as Guy Gabaldon  
 David Janssen as S/Sgt. Bill Hazen  
 Vic Damone as Cpl. Pete 'Junior' Lewis
 Patricia Owens as Sheila Lincoln
 Richard Eyer as Guy, as a boy  
 John Larch as Capt. Schwabe  
 Bill Williams as Leonard  
 Michi Kobi as Sono  
 George Shibata as Kaz Une  
 Reiko Sato as Famika  
 Richard Gardner as Polaski  
 Bob Okazaki as Papa Une  
 George Matsui as George, as a boy  
 Nicky Blair as Martini  
 George Takei as George (as George Takai)
 Miiko Taka as Ester
 Tsuru Aoki as Mother Une (as Tsuru Aoki Hayakawa)
 Sessue Hayakawa as Gen. Matsui
 Frank Gerstle as Drunken officer (uncredited)
 Paul Togawa as Freddy (uncredited)

Production 
Gramercy Pictures bought the screen rights of Gabaldon's story in June 1957. Previously, it had been featured on the TV show This Is Your Life.

Phil Karlson called it "one of the most important pictures that I may ever make because it was the true story of the Nisei, what happened in this country. But Allied Artists, even at that point, looked at it as a great war story that you could make for a price. They had no idea what I was doing."

The film was shot on location in Okinawa.

DVD release 
The DVD of the film was released on June 5, 2007 in the United States.

Novelization 
A worthwhile novelization of the screenplay was written by American writer Edward S. Aarons (1916-1975), published in a mass market, tie-in paperback edition (first printing cover price 25¢) under the Gold Medal Books imprint, with 1960 copyright assigned to Fawcett Publications.  The book's presentation falls under the category of "implied novelization," as there is no attribution anywhere to the screenplay, the screenstory or their respective authors, and the front cover action illustration of two soldiers only suggests star Jeffrey Hunter in the foreground; however the back cover contains, along with brief descriptive info, a romantic still from the movie and a blurb about the film, naming the studio, the production company and the stars. Even these indicia were removed, however, with the release of a second printing, probably a year or two later. Save for the uptick in price (40¢), the front cover illustration is identical, but the back cover is white, displaying only the brief descriptive info and the symbol of the U.S. Marine Corps. Implications of the film as source material were no doubt obliterated from the book to make the most out of the by-line, as Aarons was one of Gold Medal's most popular (and prolific) authors, and would remain so until the end of his career. (Aarons is best known for his prolific "Assignment" espionage series, featuring agent Sam Durell.)

See also
 List of American films of 1960

References

Bibliography

External links

 
 
 
 

1960 films
1960s English-language films
1960 war films
American war films
American black-and-white films
Pacific War films
Films about the internment of Japanese Americans
Films set in the Northern Mariana Islands
Films shot in Okinawa Prefecture
Films directed by Phil Karlson
Films about the United States Marine Corps
Films scored by Leith Stevens
Films set in Hawaii
Allied Artists films
Films about Mexican Americans
Films about Japanese Americans
1960s American films
1960s Japanese films